José 'Pepe' Llopis Corona (4 June 1918 – 29 January 2011) was a Spanish footballer who played as a left defender.

Over the course of seven seasons he amassed La Liga totals of 150 games and 14 goals, namely with Real Madrid.

Football career
Born in Alicante, Valencian Community, Corona made his La Liga debuts with local Hércules CF, being relegated in his first year as a professional. In 1943 he signed with Real Madrid, going on to remain in the Spanish capital for five seasons, where he appeared in a total of 143 official games; a renowned tough defender, he was also a penalty kick specialist.

Corona, the last survivor of the inaugural match at the Nuevo Chamartín on 14 December 1947, against C.F. Os Belenenses, won two Spanish Cups with the Merengues and left the club in 1948, going on to represent until his retirement three years later Gimnàstic de Tarragona (in the top level), RCD Mallorca and CF Gandía.

Honours
Real Madrid
Copa del Generalísimo: 1946, 1947
Copa Eva Duarte: 1946

Death
Corona died on 29 January 2011, in his hometown of Alicante. He was 92 years old.

References

External links
 

1918 births
2011 deaths
Footballers from Alicante
Spanish footballers
Association football defenders
La Liga players
Segunda División players
Alicante CF footballers
Hércules CF players
Real Madrid CF players
Gimnàstic de Tarragona footballers
RCD Mallorca players
Spanish football managers
CF Gandía players